Steve Jones (born 9 January 1983) is a rugby union player for Reggio in the Top12. He was born in Ashington, Northumberland, England, but has played for the Scotland under-21s and Scotland A scoring a hat-trick on his debut v Canada in 2008.

Jones' position of choice is at fullback or fly-half.

References

External links
Newcastle Falcons profile
Scotland profile
Exeter Chiefs profile

1983 births
Living people
Batley Bulldogs players
Border Reivers players
Edinburgh Rugby players
English rugby league players
English rugby union players
Huddersfield Giants players
Newcastle Falcons players
Rugby league players from Ashington
Rugby union players from Ashington
Scotland 'A' international rugby union players